Tanga Secondary Education Society is an organization based in Tanga, Tanzania.  It was formed in 1966 with a mandate to oversee the project of constructing a private secondary school and run the management of this school.

External links
TSES

Tanga, Tanzania
Educational organisations based in Tanzania
Organizations established in 1966
1966 establishments in Tanzania